Cheryl McAfee (née Soon; born 23 September 1975) is a former Australian rugby union player.

History 
McAfee represented Australia in both fifteens and sevens. She was a member of the Wallaroos squads to the 2002 and 2006 Rugby World Cups. She was also a member of the 2010 Rugby World Cup squad that finished in third place.

McAfee captained the Australian sevens team to the inaugural women's 2009 Rugby World Cup Sevens, they eventually won the tournament. She joined the IRB's Rugby Committee in 2012.

In 2021, World Rugby inducted McAfee into its World Rugby Hall of Fame, alongside Osea Kolinisau, Humphrey Kayange, Huriana Manuel, Will Carling and Jim Telfer.

References

1975 births
Living people
Australia women's international rugby union players
Australian female rugby union players
Australian female rugby sevens players
Rugby union scrum-halves
20th-century Australian women
21st-century Australian women